African Study Monographs is a peer-reviewed open access academic journal that covers African studies. Since the first issue published in 1981, African Study Monographs (ASM) has been widely circulated and read by researchers as a leading journal on African studies. The journal publishes regular issues and special issues (Supplementary Issues) . In principle, all recent papers are open access, and accepted papers are immediately published on the ASM website. Since 2021, the journal is published yearly as a soft cover book and is distributed to African countries and more than 200 African research institutes around the world. In particular, it has provided a venue for young researchers to publish their research results.

References

External links 
 Back numbers of African Study Monographs
 The Center for African Area Studies, Kyoto University

Publications established in 1982
African studies journals
Open access journals
Quarterly journals
English-language journals
Kyoto University
Academic journals published by universities and colleges
1982 establishments in Japan